193 A.D. is a year.

193 may also refer to:
 193 Ambrosia
 Connecticut Route 193
 Maryland Route 193
 West Virginia Route 193
 Alabama State Route 193
 California State Route 193
 Ohio State Route 193
 Georgia State Route 193
 Maine State Route 193
 New York State Route 193
 Tennessee State Route 193
 Utah State Route 193
 Virginia State Route 193
 Washington State Route 193
 Japan National Route 193
 Arkansas Highway 193
 Wisconsin Highway 193
 Wyoming Highway 193
 Mexican Federal Highway 193
 Texas State Highway 193
 Jordan 193
 Eyebrow No. 193, Saskatchewan
 Lectionary 193
 Radical 193
 Minuscule 193
 Trial of the 193
 DFS 193
 JWH-193
 SP-193
 USA-193
 ICRF 193
 P.S. 193
 National Airlines Flight 193
 German submarine U-193
 193rd (2nd Argyll & Sutherland Highlanders) Brigade
 193rd Battalion (Nova Scotia Highlanders), CEF
 193rd Ohio Infantry
 193rd Infantry Brigade (United States)
 193d Special Operations Squadron
 193d Special Operations Wing
 Ikkyū